Action Force is a 1980s range of European action figures.

Action Force may also refer to:

 Action Force (video game), a 1987 video game
 Action Force (Teletoon), a programming block on Canadian TV channel Teletoon
 Action Force or Action Force Monthly, UK comic series featuring reprints of G.I. Joe comics